The Ensenada de Mompiche (Mompiche Bay) is a bay on the Pacific coast of northern Ecuador.

The bay is in the Esmeraldas Province.
Parts of the bay are fringed by mangroves of the Manabí mangroves ecoregion.
The low-keyed Muisne resort is in the northern part of the bay, on a  sand bar among the mangroves of the Muisne River estuary.
It may be reached by ferry across the Muisne River from the small town of El Relleno.

Mompiche village at the south of the bay can be reached by a  potholed road from the Via del Pacifico (Ecuador Highway 15).
Its accessibility has led to small hotels and hostels being built, primarily for low-income surfers.
It extends north from the small fishing village of Mompiche to the river estuary at Muisne.
It is a popular place for surfing, and ecotourism is also popular.
The Mache Chundul National Reserve, which contains mangroves and dry forests, is near to the beach.

Notes

Sources

Geography of Esmeraldas Province
Beaches of Ecuador
Bays of Ecuador